The 1968 Ohio State Buckeyes football team is an American football team that represented the Ohio State University in the 1968 Big Ten Conference football season. It is considered one of the strongest in OSU history, fielding 11 All-Americans and six first-round NFL draft picks. With quarterback Rex Kern and running back Jim Otis leading a powerful OSU offense and Jack Tatum on defense, Woody Hayes' Buckeyes capped an undefeated season with a dominating 50–14 victory over archrival Michigan and a come-from-behind 27–16 victory over Southern California in the 1969 Rose Bowl to secure the national title. This was also the first year the Buckeye players were awarded Buckeye pride stickers for their helmets, each one a reward for a good play. This would be Ohio State's last outright national championship until 2002. Perhaps the biggest highlight of the year for the Buckeyes was their upset of #1 Purdue in their third game.

Schedule

Personnel

Game summaries

SMU

Oregon

    
    
    
    

Game statistics

Game Leaders

Purdue

    
    

Jim Otis 29 rush, 144 yards

Game statistics

Game Leaders

Northwestern

    
    
    
    
    
    
    
    
    
    

Rex Kern 20 rush, 121 yards

Game statistics

Game Leaders

Illinois

    
    
    
    
    
    
    
    

Game statistics

Game Leaders

Michigan State

    
    
    
    
    
    
    

Game statistics

Game Leaders

Wisconsin

    
    
    
    
    
    
    
    

Game statistics

Game Leaders

Iowa

    
    
    
    
    
    
    
    
    

Game statistics

Game Leaders

Michigan

    
    
    
    
    
    
    
    
    
    

Game statistics

Game Leaders

Rose Bowl

    
    
    
    
    
    
    
    

Game statistics

Game Leaders

Statistical leaders
Scoring – Jim Otis
Rushing – Jim Otis
Passing – Rex Kern
Receiving – Bruce Jankowski

Players in the 1969 NFL Draft

References

Ohio State
Ohio State Buckeyes football seasons
College football national champions
Big Ten Conference football champion seasons
Rose Bowl champion seasons
College football undefeated seasons
 Ohio State Buckeyes football